The 2018 BNP Paribas Open (also known as the 2018 Indian Wells Masters) was a professional tennis tournament played at Indian Wells, California in March 2018. It is the 45th edition of the men's event and 30th of the women's event, and is classified as an ATP World Tour Masters 1000 event on the 2018 ATP World Tour and a Premier Mandatory event on the 2018 WTA Tour. Both the men's and the women's events took place at the Indian Wells Tennis Garden in Indian Wells, California, from March 5 through March 18, 2018, on outdoor hard courts.

For the first time ever, tournament organisers offered a $1,000,000 reward to any player, male or female, who wins both singles and doubles titles in the same year. However, for the 2018 edition, no players remained in contention for the bonus reward prize.

Points and prize money

Point distribution

 Players with byes receive first-round points.

Prize money

ATP singles main-draw entrants

Seeds

The following are the seeded players. Rankings and seedings are based on ATP rankings as of March 5, 2018.

† The player did not qualify for the tournament in 2017. Accordingly, points for his 18th best result are deducted instead.
‡ The player did not qualify for the tournament in 2017, but was defending points from an ATP Challenger Tour tournament.

Withdrawals

Other entrants
The following players received wildcards into the singles main draw:
  Alex de Minaur
  Ernesto Escobedo
  Bradley Klahn
  Reilly Opelka
  Tennys Sandgren

The following players received entry using a protected ranking into the main draw:
  Yoshihito Nishioka

The following players received entry from the qualifying draw:
  Félix Auger-Aliassime
  Marcos Baghdatis
  Ričardas Berankis
  Yuki Bhambri
  Taro Daniel
  Evan King
  Mitchell Krueger
  Nicolas Mahut 
  Cameron Norrie
  Peter Polansky
  Vasek Pospisil
  Tim Smyczek

The following players entered as lucky losers:
  Ruben Bemelmans
  Matteo Berrettini
  Dudi Sela

Withdrawals
Before the tournament
  Aljaž Bedene → replaced by  Mikhail Youzhny
  Alexandr Dolgopolov → replaced by  Ivo Karlović
  Guillermo García López → replaced by  Maximilian Marterer
  Richard Gasquet → replaced by  Lukáš Lacko
  David Goffin → replaced by  Nicolás Kicker
  Robin Haase → replaced by  Radu Albot
  Denis Istomin → replaced by  Dudi Sela
  Nick Kyrgios → replaced by  Matteo Berrettini
  Paolo Lorenzi → replaced by  Stefanos Tsitsipas
  Lu Yen-hsun → replaced by  Taylor Fritz
  Florian Mayer → replaced by  Frances Tiafoe
  Andy Murray → replaced by  Víctor Estrella Burgos
  Rafael Nadal → replaced by  Marius Copil
  Kei Nishikori → replaced by  Ruben Bemelmans
  Andreas Seppi → replaced by  Márton Fucsovics
  Jo-Wilfried Tsonga → replaced by  Laslo Đere
  Stan Wawrinka → replaced by  Jérémy Chardy

During the tournament
  Marcos Baghdatis

Retirements
  Nikoloz Basilashvili
  Gaël Monfils
  Dominic Thiem

ATP doubles main-draw entrants

Seeds 

1 Rankings as of March 5, 2018.

Other entrants
The following pairs received wildcards into the doubles main draw:
  Steve Johnson /  Daniel Nestor
  Philipp Petzschner /  Dominic Thiem

WTA singles main-draw entrants

Seeds
The following are the seeded players. Seedings are based on WTA rankings as of February 26, 2018. Rankings and points before are as of March 5, 2018.

† The player did not qualify for the tournament in 2017. Accordingly, points for her 16th best result are deducted instead.

Other entrants
The following players received wildcards into the singles main draw:
  Amanda Anisimova
  Victoria Azarenka
  Eugenie Bouchard
  Danielle Collins
  Kayla Day
  Caroline Dolehide
  Claire Liu
  Sofya Zhuk

The following players received entry from the qualifying draw:
  Lara Arruabarrena
  Madison Brengle
  Duan Yingying
  Hsieh Su-wei
  Sofia Kenin
  Kurumi Nara
  Monica Niculescu
  Sara Sorribes Tormo
  Taylor Townsend
  Sachia Vickery
  Yanina Wickmayer
  Vera Zvonareva

Withdrawals
Before the tournament
  Margarita Gasparyan → replaced by  Belinda Bencic
  Camila Giorgi → replaced by  Pauline Parmentier
  Ana Konjuh → replaced by  Kaia Kanepi
  Mirjana Lučić-Baroni → replaced by  Alison Van Uytvanck
  Peng Shuai → replaced by  Verónica Cepede Royg
  Lucie Šafářová → replaced by  Petra Martić
  Laura Siegemund → replaced by  Lauren Davis

Retirements
 Kateřina Siniaková
 Carina Witthöft

WTA doubles main-draw entrants

Seeds

1 Rankings as of February 26, 2018.

Other entrants
The following pairs received wildcards into the doubles main draw:
  Victoria Azarenka /  Aryna Sabalenka
  Eugenie Bouchard /  Sloane Stephens 
  Karolína Plíšková /  Kristýna Plíšková

Champions

Men's singles

  Juan Martín del Potro def.  Roger Federer, 6–4, 6–7(8–10), 7–6(7–2)

Women's singles

  Naomi Osaka def.  Daria Kasatkina, 6–3, 6–2

Men's doubles

  John Isner /  Jack Sock def.  Bob Bryan /  Mike Bryan, 7–6(7–4), 7–6(7–2)

Women's doubles

  Hsieh Su-wei /  Barbora Strýcová def.  Ekaterina Makarova /  Elena Vesnina, 6–4, 6–4

References

External links

Association of Tennis Professionals (ATP) tournament profile

 
2018 BNP Paribas Open
2018 ATP World Tour
2018 WTA Tour
2018 in American tennis
March 2018 sports events in the United States
2018 in sports in California